This is a list of the genera, species, and subspecies belonging to the prions, which belong to the Procellariiformes.

Pachyptila
 Pachyptila turtur, fairy prion breeds on subtropical and subantarctic islands
 Pachyptila belcheri, slender-billed prion breeds on Kerguelen Island, Crozet Island, Falkland Islands, and Noir Island
 Pachyptila crassirostris, fulmar prion breeds on Auckland Island, Snares Island, Bounty Islands, Chatham Island, New Zealand, and Heard Island
 Pachyptila crassirostris crassirostris breeds on Snares Island, Bounty Islands, and Chatham Island, New Zealand
 Pachyptila crassirostris eatoni breeds on Heard Island and Auckland Island
 Pachyptila vittata, broad-billed prion breeds on islands off of New Zealand and Tristan da Cunha group
 Pachyptila desolata, Antarctic prion breeds on Crozet Island, Kerguelen Island, Macquarie Island, Auckland Island, Heard Island, Scott Island, South Georgia Island, South Sandwich Islands, and the Scotia Arc
 Pachyptila desolata desolata breeds on Crozet Island, Kerguelen Island, and Macquarie Island
 Pachyptila desolata altera breeds on Auckland Island and Heard Island
 Pachyptila desolata banksi breeds on South Georgia Island, South Sandwich Islands, Scott Island, and the Scotia Arc
 Pachyptila salvini, Salvin's prion breeds on Prince Edward Islands, Crozet Island, Amsterdam Island, and St. Paul Island
 Pachyptila salvini salvini breeds on Prince Edward Islands and Crozet Island
 Pachyptila salvini macgillivrayi breeds on Amsterdam Island and St. Paul Island

Halobaena
 Halobaena caerulea, blue petrel breeds on islands in the southern Subantarctic islands and the islands off the coast of Cape Horn

Footnotes

References
 
 

Lists of birds
Procellariiformes
Taxonomic lists (species)